The Old Synagogue in Dubrovnik, Croatia is the oldest Sefardic synagogue still in use today in the world and the second oldest synagogue in Europe. It is said to have been established in 1352, but gained legal status in the city in 1408. Owned by the local Jewish community, the main floor still functions as a place of worship for the High Holy Days and special occasions, but is now mainly a city museum which hosts numerous Jewish ritual items and centuries-old artifacts.

Location
Located in one of the many tiny streets of the Old Town of Dubrovnik, it is connected to a neighboring building which has long been owned by the Tolentino family, who have been caretakers of the synagogue for centuries. The internal layout is different from other European synagogues and has gone numerous refurbishments throughout the centuries, and has a mixture of designs from different eras. The building has sustained damage several times, with the great earthquake in 1667, World War II, and the Croatian War of Independence in the 1990s. The damage has since been repaired as closely as possible to its original design, and the synagogue reopened in 1997. The small museum contains many artifacts from throughout the Jewish community's history in the city.

History

16th to 19th centuries
After the expulsion of the Jews from Spain in 1492, many of the expelled went east and some eventually settled into independent city of Dubrovnik, where there was already a small Jewish community. Many Conversos (Marranos)—Jews from Spain and Portugal—came to the city; in May, 1544, a ship landed there filled exclusively with Portuguese refugees, as Balthasar de Faria reported to King John. During this time there worked in the city one of the most famous cannon and bell founders of his time: Ivan Rabljanin (Magister Johannes Baptista Arbensis de la Tolle). Many Jews became traders and craftsmen, dealing with spices, silks, fabrics, and crafts that were in demand at a seaport city. In 1546, Dubrovnik officials allocated a Jewish settlement within the city, with the main street being called Ulica Zudioska ("Jewish Street") in the Dubrovnik Ghetto. The 1667 Dubrovnik earthquake caused much damage to the city, including the synagogue.

Jews were still persecuted in the areas around Dubrovnik under Venetian law and attitudes of the local Catholic Church. When Dubrovnik's economic position and power declined in the mid-18th century, Jews were prohibited from engaging in commerce and confined to the ghetto. When Dalmatia and Dubrovnik were occupied by Napoleon I's forces in 1808, essentially ending Dubrovnik's centuries of independence, Jews attained legal equality for the first time. However, when the Austrian Empire annexed Dalmatia in 1814, legal equality was again withdrawn. Jews were granted legal equality under Croatian law in the mid-late 19th century.

20th century and after

During World War II, Croatia came under the rule of fascists: Dubrovnik was occupied first by the Italian army, and then by the German army after 8 September 1943. Before the Holocaust, 250 Jews lived in Dubrovnik; many were transferred to the island of Lopud along with other Jews from different parts of Croatia, then in June 1943 they were transferred to the Rab concentration camp with most Jews from Italian-occupied lands. In October 1944 Josip Broz Tito's Partisans entered Dubrovnik, and many Jews were transferred by the partisans to the freed territories; the rest were sent by the Germans to concentration camps. After the war, many of the surviving Dubrovnik Jews settled in Israel. Today, approximately 30 Jews live in Dubrovnik, however, only 17 officially registered in the 2001 census. During the Croatian War of Independence, the city was besieged by the Serbian and Montenegrin paramilitary forces in what has been called the Siege of Dubrovnik. Approximately two thirds of the old city was in some way damaged, including the synagogue, where shells and grenades hit the adjacent buildings in 1991, shattering the windows of the sanctuary and Jewish Community Headquarters. In 1992, an artillery shell hit through the roof of the synagogue, causing the congregation to pack up over 80 items to send to the Yeshiva University museum, which included a 13th-century Torah and silver ornaments and textiles. After the war ended, a legal battle ensued between a Manhattan doctor Michael Papo, former president of Dubrovnik community and a direct descendant of Tolentino family, and at the time leader of the Dubrovnik Jewish community late Dr. Bruno Horowitz and the state of Croatia over the synagogue's treasures; eventually, a court ruled in 1998 that the treasures be returned to Dubrovnik.

Today, because of the small number of Jews in Dubrovnik, the synagogue does not have its own rabbi. On holy days, a visiting rabbi would conduct services for the small community. In 2003, Israeli president Moshe Katsav visited the Dubrovnik synagogue on a visit to Croatia.

References

External links

 Beth Hatefutsoth: Jewish Community of Dubrovnik 

15th-century synagogues
Buildings and structures in Dubrovnik
Jewish museums
Museums in Dubrovnik
Orthodox Judaism in Croatia
Orthodox synagogues
Sephardi Jewish culture in Croatia
Sephardi synagogues
Spanish-Jewish diaspora in Europe
Synagogues in Croatia
Synagogues preserved as museums
Tourist attractions in Dubrovnik-Neretva County